Dive! was a 300-seat restaurant, shaped like a neon-yellow submarine located in the Marketplace food court of the Century City Shopping Center, Los Angeles, California. It was owned by director Steven Spielberg and Disney Studios Chairman Jeffrey Katzenberg, and operated by Larry Levy, the Chairman of Levy Restaurants. The restaurant had a nautical theme to it, owing to Spielberg's love of undersea exploration. Dive! opened in May 1994, and was a popular hangout of celebrities until it closed in January 1999. A branch in Las Vegas opened in 1995, but would also close its doors by the early 2000s.

References

Restaurants established in 1994
1999 disestablishments in California
Defunct restaurants in Los Angeles
Theme restaurants
1994 establishments in California
Jeffrey Katzenberg
Steven Spielberg